Charles Thomas Taylor (October 21, 1867 – May 18, 1934) was an American football coach.  He was the fifth head football coach at the University of Richmond in Richmond, Virginia, serving for one season, in 1890, and compiling a record of 0–3. He was later a minister.

Head coaching record

References

External links
 

1867 births
1934 deaths
Richmond Spiders football coaches
University of Richmond alumni
People from Chesterfield County, Virginia